Pierzchów  is a village in the administrative district of Gmina Gdów, within Wieliczka County, Lesser Poland Voivodeship, in southern Poland. General Jan Henryk Dąbrowski was born in Pierzchów.

The village has a population of 560.

References

Villages in Wieliczka County
Kraków Voivodeship (14th century – 1795)